Ursa Major Technologies is an American aerospace company founded in 2015 and based in Berthoud, Colorado. The company produces rocket engines and sells them to rocket launching companies.

The company makes a 5,000-pound thrust liquid oxygen and kerosene Hadley engine, named after a character in Ray Bradbury's The Veldt.
It also develops the Ripley engine, with 50,000 pounds of thrust, aimed at the medium-launch market.

Its commercial customers include C6 Launch Systems, a Canadian small satellite launcher, and U.S. launch startup Phantom Space. It also works with Generation Orbit Launch Services and with Stratolaunch.

In 2017, Ursa Major raised $8 million last with participation from the Space Angels Network.

In December 2021 the company closed its largest funding round to date: an $85 million Series C led by funds and accounts managed by BlackRock.

In January 2022 the company had 141 employees.

Engines

See also 

 Relativity Space
 Isar Aerospace
 Rocket Factory Augsburg AG
 Vector Launch
 Orbex
 Skyrora
 PLD Space
 Radian Aerospace

References

External links 
 Official Website

Aerospace companies of the United States
Private spaceflight companies
Privately held companies based in Colorado
American companies established in 2015